Dame Nellie Melba Scholarship may refer to any of several prizes awarded by the great soprano or in her name.

London
In 1911 Melba donated a scholarship of £30 tenable at the Guildhall School of Music for one year's tuition, at least partly as a tribute to her friend the conductor Landon Ronald, who had recently taken over as a principal of the School. The scholarship would be awarded by competition, open to sopranos aged between 16 and 22, of which there were around forty candidates, most already Guildhall students. The Guildhall School of Music was at the time competing for students with the Royal Academy of Music and the Royal College of Music.

Among successful candidates were:
1912 Dora Briscoe
1915 Dorothy Waring

Melbourne
The first Australian Melba Scholarship, organised by the ANA, was a vocal scholarship of £30, of which £10 was provided by Dame Nellie and the remainder by Warrnambool local interests.
1908 Elsie (later Elsa) Warman

Albert Street Conservatorium
A scholarship, valued at 75 guineas, tenable for two years' tuition at the Albert Street Conservatorium, was inaugurated in 1916.
1916 Doris L. Leech Nathalie Muir won an exhibition and Ruby Croft an honorable mention, though subsequent reports claim both these contestants as prizewinners.

1919 Eileen Mary Starr
1921 Marie Bremner
1924 Alma O'Dea
1927 Victoria Wilson won "special Melba scholarship" later Mrs Schleebs
1930 Mary Pitman, later, as Margaret Pitman, embroiled in dispute over her mother's will.
Melba died in 1931 leaving, inter alia, £8,000 to the Albert Street Conservatorium to provide a continuing scholarship. Much was expended in settling points of law regarding the setting up and administration of the bequest.
 Henceforth called Melba Bequest Scholarship, open to women of 17 years or older, any voice, trained or untrained.
1935 Hinemoa Rosieur
1937 Jean Love
1940 Patricia Hill
1941 Sybil Welley
1943 Elsie Morison
1946 Beryl Jones (declined) Sylvia Biddle (accepted)
1949 Joyce Simmons

Melba Memorial Conservatorium of Music
(from 1956 the renamed Albert Street Conservatorium)
may include
Victor Olof, violinist
Patrick Roberts, violinist

Melba Opera Trust
Took over from Melba Memorial Conservatorium in 2008
2009, 2010 Stephanie Gibson
2010 Janet Todd
2010 Jacqueline Porter
2011, 2012 Lauren Fagan
2013 Emily Edmonds
2014, 2015 Jade Moffat mezzo-soprano
2016, 2017 Zoe Drummond
2018 Jessica Harper soprano
2019 Tessa Hayward
2020 Rebecca Hart mezzo-soprano
2021 Katherine Allen

Elsewhere
Artists claimed to have won a Melba scholarship, for which no further information has been found, include
Dora Labbette "studied with Lisa Lehmann on a Melba Scholarship" — Oxford Reference
Rose Carwardine
Mabel Gibson
Anona Winn (born Anona Edna Wilkins)

References 

Awards established in 1908
Australian music awards